Chris Bachelder (born 1971) is an American writer and frequent contributor to the publications McSweeney's Quarterly Concern and The Believer.

Born in Minneapolis, Minnesota, he grew up in Christiansburg, Virginia. He attended Virginia Tech (BA, 1992) and the University of Florida at Gainesville (MFA, 2002).

Bachelder has taught fiction writing and literature courses at Colorado College (Assistant Professor), North Carolina Governor's School West, New Mexico State University (Visiting Professor), and The University of Massachusetts Amherst MFA Program for Poets & Writers, along with Sabina Murray, Noy Holland and Anthony Giardina. He currently teaches at the University of Cincinnati (Associate Professor).

Bachelder's e-book, Lessons in Virtual Tour Photography, was McSweeney's first career-development e-book. By 2004, more than 45,000 people had downloaded the novel.  His most recent novel, The Throwback Special, was published by W.W. Norton and Company in March 2016 and was named as a finalist for the National Book Award.

Bibliography
 Bear v. Shark (Scribner, 2001)
 Lessons in Virtual Tour Photography (e-book), 2006, McSweeney's
 U.S.! (Bloomsbury USA, 2006).
 Abbott Awaits (Louisiana State University Press, 2011)
 The Throwback Special (W. W. Norton, 2016)

References

External links
 Chris Bachelder, Lessons in Virtual Tour Photography (free e-book), McSweeney's
 Chris Bachelder faculty page at University of Cincinnati

1971 births
Living people
American male novelists
Massachusetts culture
People from Christiansburg, Virginia
University of Florida alumni
Virginia Tech alumni
University of Massachusetts Amherst faculty
Colorado College faculty
New Mexico State University faculty
21st-century American novelists
21st-century American male writers
Novelists from Massachusetts
Novelists from Colorado